Hamilton Municipal Airport  is a city-owned public-use airport located two miles (3 km) south of the central business district of Hamilton, a city in Hamilton County, Texas, United States.

Although most U.S. airports use the same three-letter location identifier for the FAA and IATA, Hamilton Municipal Airport is assigned MNZ by the FAA but has no designation from the IATA.

Facilities and aircraft
For the 12-month period ending September 15, 2005, the airport had 5,048 aircraft operations, an average of 13 per day: 99% general aviation, 0.5% air taxi and 0.5% military. At that time there were 20 aircraft based at this airport: 95% single-engine and 5% multi-engine.

History
Provided contract glider training to the United States Army Air Forces, 1942–1944. Training provided by Hunter Flying Service. Used primarily C-47 Skytrains and Waco CG-4 unpowered Gliders. The mission of the school was to train glider pilot students in proficiency in operation of gliders in various types of towed and soaring flight, both day and night, and in servicing of gliders in the field.

See also

 Texas World War II Army Airfields
 31st Flying Training Wing (World War II)

References

 Manning, Thomas A. (2005), History of Air Education and Training Command, 1942–2002.  Office of History and Research, Headquarters, AETC, Randolph AFB, Texas 
 Shaw, Frederick J. (2004), Locating Air Force Base Sites, History’s Legacy, Air Force History and Museums Program, United States Air Force, Washington DC.

External links
 Hamilton Municipal Airport at City of Hamilton website
 
 

1942 establishments in Texas
Airports established in 1942
USAAF Contract Flying School Airfields
USAAF Glider Training Airfields
Airfields of the United States Army Air Forces in Texas
Airports in Texas
Buildings and structures in Hamilton County, Texas
Transportation in Hamilton County, Texas